No More Tours II was the second farewell and final tour by British metal vocalist Ozzy Osbourne, the first being No More Tours Tour in 1992.

Background 
The tour's South American and European legs were announced in November 2017. In the press release, he stated that it would be his final world tour, but didn't rule out the possibility of one-off shows later on. North American tour dates were announced in February 2018.

On 29 January 2019, it was announced through Osbourne's website that the European leg of the tour was to be postponed until later in the year due to illness, and would resume in Australia in March, but this leg of the tour was cancelled. The European leg of the tour was rescheduled for September. Osbourne was due to start his 2020 North American Tour in May, but on 17 February 2020, Osbourne cancelled the tour as he was scheduled to go to Switzerland in April to undergo medical treatment which would last six to eight weeks.

Due to the COVID-19 pandemic and Osbourne's health resulting in the cancellation of performances in 2019 and 2020, Osbourne would have resumed touring again in 2023, following the postponement of the 2022 shows. However, on 1 February 2023, it was announced that, due to Osbourne not sufficiently recovering from medical treatment, that he would retire from touring, cancelling the planned 2023 dates.

Setlist 
This setlist is from the Allentown concert on 30 August 2018. It is not intended to represent all shows from the tour.

 "Bark at the Moon"
 "Mr. Crowley"
 "I Don't Know"
 "Fairies Wear Boots" (Black Sabbath cover)
 "Suicide Solution"
 "No More Tears"
 "Road To Nowhere"
 "War Pigs" (Black Sabbath cover)
 "Miracle Man" / "Crazy Babies" / "Desire" / "Perry Mason" (Zakk Wylde guitar solo medley)
 Drum Solo
 "I Don't Want to Change the World"
 "Shot in the Dark"
 "Crazy Train"
Encore
 "Mama, I'm Coming Home"
 "Paranoid" (Black Sabbath cover)

Tour dates

Cancelled tour dates
These tour dates were supposed to be run after delays due to the COVID-19 pandemic and Osbourne's medical treatment, but were cancelled when Osbourne retired from touring on 1 February 2023.

Personnel 
 Ozzy Osbourne – lead vocals
 Zakk Wylde – lead guitar, backing vocals
 Rob "Blasko" Nicholson – bass
 Tommy Clufetos – drums
 Adam Wakeman – keyboards and synthesizers, rhythm guitar, backing vocals

References 

2018 concert tours
Ozzy Osbourne concert tours
Farewell concert tours
Concert tours postponed due to the COVID-19 pandemic